Bitburg is a city in Germany, in the state of Rhineland-Palatinate approximately 25 km (16 mi.) northwest of Trier and 50 km (31 mi.) northeast of Luxembourg city. The American Spangdahlem Air Base is nearby.

History

The city's name derives from its Celtic toponym, Beda.

Bitburg originated approximately 2,000 years ago as a stopover for traffic from Lyon through Metz and Trier to Cologne. The first name mentioned was Vicus Beda. Emperor Constantine the Great expanded the settlement to a road castle around 330, the central part of which forms the town centre today. Bitburg is first documented only after the end of the Roman Empire around 715 as castrum bedense. It subsequently became part of Franconia.

The first mention of Bitburg in historic annals occurred in connection with the signing in 1239 of the Trier-Luxembourg Treaty between Archbishop Theoderich II of Trier and Countess Ermesinde II of Luxemburg, under which the town came under the archbishopric's protection. Bitburg received a town charter in 1262 from Count Henry V of Luxembourg.

In 1443, Bitburg came under the sway of the Duchy of Burgundy, then in 1506 was acquired by the Austrian Netherlands, which controlled most of modern Belgium. In 1794 the city came under French administration, and in 1798 became part of the newly created Département des Forêts. This led to a short lived economic upturn, and Bitburg received among other things a court and a land registry.

In 1815, under agreements at the Congress of Vienna following the final defeat of Napoleon Bonaparte, Bitburg was, after having been a part of the Duchy of Luxembourg for centuries, transferred to the Kingdom of Prussia, where until 1822 it belonged administratively to the province of Lower Rhine, and afterwards to the Rhine province. With the unification of Germany under Prussian dominance in 1871, Bitburg became part of the German Empire, and after World War I the Weimar Republic of Germany.

In the interwar years, Bitburg, like most of the Eifel region, was impoverished and comparatively backward. Economic growth began after the Nazi Seizure of Power and the Nazi regime's introduction of employment-boosting public works projects, including infrastructure for war, particularly the Westwall; new armed forces barracks; and the development of the Nims-Sauer Valley railway. It is said that the building now used as the post office at Bitburg Annex (what is left of Bitburg Air Base) was the headquarters for Adolf Hitler when he was in the city.

In late December 1944, Bitburg was 85 percent destroyed by Allied bombing attacks, and later officially designated by the U.S. military as a "dead city." Subsequently, the town was occupied by Luxembourg soldiers, who were replaced by French forces in 1955.

In 1952 a North Atlantic Treaty Organization (NATO) base was opened at Bitburg by the U.S. Air Force. At the end of the 1980s, French troops were withdrawn and NATO took over the former French barracks. After the First Gulf War most of the USAF forces were moved to the larger Spangdahlem Air Base, about 12 km east of Bitburg. In 1994, NATO turned the Bitburg Air Base over to the city, which devoted it to public works projects. The Nims-Sauer Valley railway was abandoned step by step, beginning in 1969. Parts of it were converted into a bicycle path (Radweg).

In 1985, Bitburg came to international attention due to a ceremonial visit by U.S. President Ronald Reagan and German Chancellor Helmut Kohl to the nearby Kolmeshöhe Military Cemetery – which among its 2,000 graves included those of 49 members of the Waffen-SS. Chelsea Clinton had written a letter urging President Reagan not to visit the town.

Economics and industry

The most widely known Bitburg enterprise, and landmark of the city, is the Bitburger brewery. Its Pilsener-style lager beer ranks No. 3 among Germany's best selling beers, with sales of 3.86 million hectolitres (in 2008).

In 1995, the former NATO base was designated the Bitburg Airfield Trade Area, providing commercial development district where 180 enterprises have established themselves.

Transport

Bitburg-Erdorf station is part of the Eifel line (KBS 474). Trains that pass through include:
The Eifel Mosel express (RE 12) - Cologne, Euskirchen, Gerolstein, Trier.
 The Eifel line (RB 83) - Gerolstein, Trier.

Points of interest

The Regional Museum of Bitburg-Prüm is housed in a former agricultural school. It contains numerous artifacts of the history of Bitburg and the Eifel Region in general.

In the cultural centre Haus Beda are exhibited works of the Düsseldorf painter Fritz von Wille (1860–1941), the Eifel's most widely known artist. More than 100 paintings are on display, including Die blaue Blume, Mosenberg, Burg Reifferscheid im Winter and Ein klarer Tag.

International relations

Bitburg is partnered or twinned with:
  Arlon, Belgium since 1965
  Bad Köstritz (Thuringia), Germany since 1992
  Diekirch, Luxembourg since 1962
  Rethel, France since 1965
  Shelbyville, Kentucky (USA) since 1962

Born in Bitburg
 Christopher Robbins
(Born 1986) American Influencer
 Charles-Mathias Simons (1802-1874), Luxembourg jurist and politician
 Tom G. Palmer (born 1956), libertarian author and theorist
 Jean-Marc Barr (born 1960), French actor, director, filmmaker and screenwriter
 Chace Dominguez (born 1992), American Businessman

References

External links 

 The Eighties Club: Bitburg 

Celtic toponyms
Bitburg-Prüm